Norman A. Beecher (April 22, 1830May 23, 1892) was a Michigan politician.

Early life
Norman A. Beecher was born in Rensselaerville, New York on April 22, 1830 to Calvin and Emeline Beecher. Norman was moved with his family to Owego, New York in 1834. Norman then moved to Orleans County, New York at age 21 around 1851.

Career
Beecher moved to Michigan in 1857, and settled down on a farm in Clayton Township, Michigan the next year. In 1879, Beecher became the first to introduce the American Holderness cattle to Michigan. Beecher was raised as a Democrat, and voted for James Buchanan, but in the 1860 presidential election, Beecher voted for Abraham Lincoln. From then on, Beecher was a Republican. Beecher served as the superintendent of schools in Clayton Township from 1875 to 1876. On November 4, 1884, Beecher was elected to the Michigan House of Representatives where he represented the Genesee County 1st district from January 7, 1885 to December 31, 1888.

Personal life
Beecher married Lovenia D. Billings on September 19, 1855. Lovenia died on September 9, 1874. Beecher went on to marry Marcelia A. Wood on December 1, 1875. Beecher had two children with each of his wives. Beecher was a member of the Methodist Episcopal Church.

Death
Beecher died in Clayton Township on May 23, 1892. Beecher was interred at the Flushing City Cemetery.

References

1830 births
1892 deaths
Methodists from Michigan
Burials in Michigan
Farmers from Michigan
People from Rensselaerville, New York
People from Orleans County, New York
People from Genesee County, Michigan
Members of the Michigan House of Representatives
New York (state) Democrats
Michigan Republicans
19th-century American politicians